The Midland Railway was a British railway company between 1844 and 1922.

Midland Railway may also refer to:

Argentina
 Buenos Aires Midland Railway

Australia 
 Midland Railway of Western Australia, two legal entities with the same name

Canada 
 Midland Railway of Canada, in Ontario
 Midland Railway (Canada), in Nova Scotia

New Zealand 
 Midland Line, New Zealand, built by the New Zealand Midland Railway Company

United Kingdom
 Midland Railway – Butterley, a preserved railway on one of the Midland Railway's lines
 West Midland Railway, a British railway company between 1860 and 1863

United States 
 Midland Railway (Kansas), a heritage railroad in Baldwin City, Kansas
 Midland Railway (Georgia), which operated in the US from 1915 to 1924
 Central Midland Railway
 Maryland Midland Railway
 New Jersey Midland Railway
 Gainesville Midland Railway, a Georgia railroad

See also
 Midland Railroad (disambiguation)
 Midland Line (disambiguation)